Neil Derek Richard Bannister (born 10 July 1973) is a former English cricketer.  Bannister was a right-handed batsman who bowled right-arm medium pace.  He was born in Leigh, Lancashire.

Bannister represented the Lancashire Cricket Board in 2 List A matches against Suffolk and the Essex Cricket Board in the 2000 NatWest Trophy.  In his 2 List A matches, he scored 66 runs at a batting average of 33.00, with a single half century high score of 62.

References

External links
Neil Bannister at Cricinfo
Neil Bannister at CricketArchive

1973 births
Living people
Sportspeople from Leigh, Greater Manchester
English cricketers
Lancashire Cricket Board cricketers